Brian Norton (27 December 1944 – 22 April 2018) nicknamed "Chicka" was an Australian rugby league footballer who played in the 1960s and 1970s and coached in the 1980s. He played in the NSWRFL premiership for North Sydney and St George as a prop.

Early life
Norton was born and raised in North Sydney and played his junior rugby league in the area.  Norton then moved to Tamworth in country New South Wales and was selected to play in the country representative side in 1967.

Playing career
Norton was graded by the club he supported as a child, the North Sydney Bears in 1968.  Norton spent three years at Norths but the club struggled on the field finishing near the bottom of the table.  In 1971, Norton joined St George but did not feature in the club's finals campaign or grand final loss to Souths that year.  In 1972, Norton featured more prominently for St George and played in both the club's finals matches as they made it to the preliminary final before being defeated by Eastern Suburbs.  St George then qualified for the finals the following year with Norton featuring in both games against Newtown which ended in defeat.  In 1975, Norton re-joined North Sydney and spent one last season at the club as they finished 9th on the table before retiring as a player.

Coaching career
Norton began his coaching career when he replaced Gregory Hawick as coach of North Sydney midway through the 1985 season.  At the time of coming in as coach, North Sydney were in danger of finishing last on the table but he guided North Sydney to safety with an 11th-placed finish. Norton is credited with bringing back a fighting spirit to the Norths club and he instilled a motto for the team to follow which was “The real winners are those who lose but keep fighting".

In his first full season as coach, Norton guided Norths to the finals in 1986.  At the time, Norths had only managed to qualify for the finals on 2 occasions in the last 20 years before this. Norths went on to lose their elimination final against Balmain played at the Sydney Cricket Ground.  Despite having a successful season, Norton stood down as coach and was replaced by Frank Stanton for the 1987 season.  Even though Norton's tenure at the club was short, his impact on the club changed the culture at Norths and set them on a path over the next decade to go from easy beats to title contenders.

After leaving Norths, Norton went and coached in Darwin before returning to North Sydney and became a board member at the club.

References

1944 births
2018 deaths
Australian rugby league coaches
Australian rugby league players
North Sydney Bears coaches
North Sydney Bears players
Rugby league props
Rugby league players from Sydney
St. George Dragons players